The 1992–93 NBA season was the Rockets' 26th season in the National Basketball Association, and 22nd season in Houston. After missing the playoffs the previous year, the Rockets selected Robert Horry from the University of Alabama with the eleventh pick in the 1992 NBA draft. During the off-season, the Rockets acquired Scott Brooks from the Minnesota Timberwolves. For the season opener, the Rockets traveled to Yokohama, Japan to play their first two games against the Seattle SuperSonics. The Rockets got off to a 14–9 start to the season, but then struggled posting a 7-game losing streak between December and January. However, they won eight consecutive games afterwards, and held a 30–21 record at the All-Star break. The Rockets went 25–6 for the remainder of the season, posting a 15-game winning streak between February and March, and then posting an 11-game winning streak in April, as the team signed free agent Terry Teagle, who played in the final two games of the regular season. The Rockets finished first place in the Midwest Division with a 55–27 record.

Hakeem Olajuwon averaged 26.1 points, 13.0 rebounds, 3.5 assists, 1.8 steals and 4.2 blocks per game, and was named Defensive Player of the Year, and was named to the All-NBA First Team, NBA All-Defensive First Team, and was selected for the 1993 NBA All-Star Game. He also finished in second place in Most Valuable Player voting behind Charles Barkley. In addition, Vernon Maxwell averaged 13.8 points per game, while Kenny Smith contributed 13.0 points and 5.4 assists per game, Otis Thorpe provided the team with 12.8 points and 8.2 rebounds per game, and Horry averaged 10.1 points, 5.0 rebounds and 1.1 blocks per game, and was selected to the NBA All-Rookie Second Team. Head coach Rudy Tomjanovich finished in second place in Coach of the Year voting.

In the Western Conference First Round of the playoffs, the Rockets defeated the Los Angeles Clippers in five games, but lost in seven to the SuperSonics in the Western Conference Semi-finals. A notable note about the Rockets' playoff run that year was the final game of the regular season. The Rockets were playing against the San Antonio Spurs on the road on April 25, with the Rockets leading by 2 in the final seconds, until David Robinson tip-dunked a missed shot after time expired. It was ruled good, and the Rockets went on to lose in overtime 119–117, tying their record with Seattle, and losing home court advantage due to their match-up tie-breaker against the Sonics in the second round, and ended up losing the decisive Game 7 in overtime, 103–100 at Seattle.

Following the season, Sleepy Floyd signed as a free agent with the San Antonio Spurs, and Teagle was released to free agency.

Draft picks

Roster

Regular season

Season standings

y – clinched division title
x – clinched playoff spot

z – clinched division title
y – clinched division title
x – clinched playoff spot

Record vs. opponents

Game log

Regular season

|- align="center" bgcolor="#ccffcc"
| 16
| December 11
| @ Chicago
| W 110–96
|
|
|
| Chicago Stadium
| 10–6
|- align="center" bgcolor="#ffcccc"
| 25
| December 30
| @ Phoenix
| L 110–133
|
|
|
| America West Arena
| 14–11

|- align="center" bgcolor="#ffcccc"
| 28
| January 5
| Phoenix
| L 104–106
|
|
|
| The Summit
| 14–14
|- align="center" bgcolor="#ccffcc"
| 41
| January 28
| Chicago
| W 94–83
|
|
|
| The Summit
| 23–18

|- align="center" bgcolor="#ccffcc"
| 53
| February 25
| Phoenix
| W 131–104
|
|
|
| The Summit
| 32–21

|- align="center" bgcolor="#ccffcc"
| 79
| April 19
| @ Phoenix
| W 111–97
|
|
|
| America West Arena
| 54–25

Playoffs

|- align="center" bgcolor="#ccffcc"
| 1
| April 29
| L.A. Clippers
| W 117–94
| Hakeem Olajuwon (28)
| Hakeem Olajuwon (11)
| Winston Garland (9)
| The Summit16,611
| 1–0
|- align="center" bgcolor="#ffcccc"
| 2
| May 1
| L.A. Clippers
| L 83–95
| Hakeem Olajuwon (30)
| Hakeem Olajuwon (14)
| three players tied (4)
| The Summit16,611
| 1–1
|- align="center" bgcolor="#ccffcc"
| 3
| May 3
| @ L.A. Clippers
| W 111–99
| Hakeem Olajuwon (32)
| Hakeem Olajuwon (12)
| Kenny Smith (7)
| Los Angeles Memorial Sports Arena12,628
| 2–1
|- align="center" bgcolor="#ffcccc"
| 4
| May 5
| @ L.A. Clippers
| L 90–93
| Hakeem Olajuwon (25)
| Hakeem Olajuwon (18)
| Hakeem Olajuwon (9)
| Los Angeles Memorial Sports Arena14,710
| 2–2
|- align="center" bgcolor="#ccffcc"
| 5
| May 8
| L.A. Clippers
| W 84–80
| Hakeem Olajuwon (31)
| Hakeem Olajuwon (21)
| Kenny Smith (6)
| The Summit16,611
| 3–2
|-

|- align="center" bgcolor="#ffcccc"
| 1
| May 10
| @ Seattle
| L 90–99
| Hakeem Olajuwon (26)
| Hakeem Olajuwon (16)
| Smith, Horry (5)
| Seattle Center Coliseum14,252
| 0–1
|- align="center" bgcolor="#ffcccc"
| 2
| May 12
| @ Seattle
| L 100–111
| Hakeem Olajuwon (28)
| Hakeem Olajuwon (13)
| Vernon Maxwell (9)
| Seattle Center Coliseum14,732
| 0–2
|- align="center" bgcolor="#ccffcc"
| 3
| May 15
| Seattle
| W 97–79
| Otis Thorpe (28)
| Otis Thorpe (14)
| Kenny Smith (6)
| The Summit16,611
| 1–2
|- align="center" bgcolor="#ccffcc"
| 4
| May 16
| Seattle
| W 103–92
| Hakeem Olajuwon (24)
| Hakeem Olajuwon (12)
| Scott Brooks (7)
| The Summit16,611
| 2–2
|- align="center" bgcolor="#ffcccc"
| 5
| May 18
| @ Seattle
| L 95–120
| Hakeem Olajuwon (25)
| Hakeem Olajuwon (14)
| Hakeem Olajuwon (5)
| Seattle Center Coliseum14,433
| 2–3
|- align="center" bgcolor="#ccffcc"
| 6
| May 20
| Seattle
| W 103–90
| Kenny Smith (30)
| Olajuwon, Thorpe (10)
| Robert Horry (7)
| The Summit16,611
| 3–3
|- align="center" bgcolor="#ffcccc"
| 7
| May 22
| @ Seattle
| L 100–103 (OT)
| Hakeem Olajuwon (23)
| Hakeem Olajuwon (17)
| Hakeem Olajuwon (9)
| Seattle Center Coliseum14,812
| 3–4
|-

Player statistics

NOTE: Please write the players statistics in alphabetical order by last name.

Season

Playoffs

Awards and records
 Hakeem Olajuwon, NBA Defensive Player of the Year Award
 Hakeem Olajuwon, All-NBA First Team
 Hakeem Olajuwon, NBA All-Defensive First Team
 Robert Horry, NBA All-Rookie Team 2nd Team

Transactions

See also
1992–93 NBA season

References

Houston Rockets seasons